Pacificibacter maritimus is a Gram-negative, aerobic and non-motile bacterium from the genus of Pacificibacter which has been isolated from sandy sediments from the Sea of Japan.

References

External links
Type strain of Pacificibacter maritimus at BacDive -  the Bacterial Diversity Metadatabase

Rhodobacteraceae
Bacteria described in 2011